The King's German Legion (KGL; , semantically erroneous obsolete German variations are ,) was a British Army unit of mostly expatriated German personnel during the period 1803–16.  The legion achieved the distinction of being the only German force to fight without interruption against the French during the Napoleonic Wars.

The legion was formed within months of the dissolution of the Electorate of Hanover in 1803 and constituted as a mixed corps by the end of 1803. Although the legion never fought autonomously and remained a part of the British Army during the Napoleonic Wars (1804–15), it played a vital role in several campaigns, most notably the Walcheren Campaign, the Peninsular War, and the Hundred Days (1815).

The legion was disbanded in 1816. Several of the units were incorporated into the army of the Kingdom of Hanover, and became later a part of the Imperial German Army after unification in 1871.

The British German Legion, recruited for the Crimean War, is sometimes erroneously referred to as the "King's German Legion".

History 

After the occupation of Hanover by Napoleonic troops the Convention of Artlenburg, also called the Convention of the Elbe, was signed on 5 July 1803 and formally dissolved the Electorate of Hanover.  Consequently, the Elector's army was disbanded. Many former Hanoverian officers and soldiers fled the French occupation of Hanover to Britain; George III, the deposed Elector of Hanover, was also King of the United Kingdom.
The same year, Major Colin Halkett and Colonel Johann Friedrich von der Decken were issued warrants to raise a corps of light infantry, to be named "The King's German Regiment". On 19 December 1803, Halkett's and von der Decken's levies were combined as a basis of a mixed corps (includes all arms: mounted, infantry, artillery) renamed the King's German Legion. The KGL infantry were quartered in Bexhill-on-Sea and the cavalry in Weymouth, Dorset. Some units were  involved in a street fight in Tullamore, Ireland with a British Light infantry unit in the so-called Battle of Tullamore.
The number of officers and other ranks grew over time to approximately 14,000, but during the 13 years of its existence, close to 28,000 men served in the legion at one time or another. Initially, most of the officers were appointed with temporary rank, but in 1812 all the officers of the legion were given permanent rank in the British Army for 'having so frequently distinguished themselves against the enemy.' It saw active service as an integral part of the British Army from 1805 to 1816, after which its units were disbanded.

Organisation

Cavalry 
 1st Regiment of Dragoons (1804–1812, red jacket)
 changed into: 1st Regiment of Light Dragoons (1812–1816, blue jacket)
 2nd Regiment of Dragoons (1805–1812, red jacket)
 changed into: 2nd Regiment of Light Dragoons (1812–1816, blue jacket)
 1st Regiment of Hussars
 2nd Regiment of Hussars
 3rd Regiment of Hussars

Infantry 
 1st Light Infantry Battalion
 2nd Light Infantry Battalion
 1st Line Battalion
 2nd Line Battalion
 3rd Line Battalion
 4th Line Battalion
 5th Line Battalion
 6th Line Battalion
 7th Line Battalion
 8th Line Battalion

Artillery and engineers 
 King's German Artillery
 2 horse batteries
 4 foot batteries
 King's German Engineers

Campaigns 
Although the legion never fought autonomously, its units participated in campaigns in Hanover, Pomerania, Copenhagen and Walcheren, the Peninsular War under General Sir John Moore; and the retreat to Corunna; the Peninsular Campaign under the Duke of Wellington, including the battles of Bussaco, Barrosa, Fuentes de Onoro, Albuera, Ciudad Rodrigo, Salamanca, Garcia Hernandez, Burgos, Venta del Pozo, Vittoria, San Sebastian, Nivelle, Orthez, Sicily, and the eastern parts of Spain, Northern Germany and Göhrde.

In the Peninsular Campaign, the Germans enhanced the veteran core of the British army.  At Sabugal, in April 1811, several hundred German hussars augmented the Light Division, and the Hussars found the proper ford of the Coa River. At the Battle of Garcia Hernandez, the Dragoons performed the unusual feat of smashing two French square formations in a matter of minutes.

At the Battle of Waterloo, the 2nd Light Battalion – with members of the 1st Light Battalion and the 5th Line Battalion – defended the farmhouse and road at "La Haye Sainte." As the 5th Line Battalion under Oberst Ompteda
was on its way to reinforce the defenders of Haye Sainte, the French cavalry attached to Jean-Baptiste Drouet, Comte d'Erlon's Corp I rode them down; only a few of the intended relievers survived. After a six-hour defence, without ammunition, or reinforcements, the Germans were forced to abandon the farm, leaving the buildings in shambles and their dead behind.

Legacy 

The legion was known for its excellent discipline and fighting ability. The cavalry was reputed to be among the best in the British army. According to the historian Alessandro Barbero, the King's German Legion "had such a high degree of professionalism that it was considered equal in every way to the best British units." After the victory at Waterloo, the Electorate of Hanover was re-founded as the Kingdom of Hanover. However, the army of Hanover had been reconstituted even before the final battle, so that there were two Hanoverian armies in existence. In 1816 the legion was dissolved and some officers and men were integrated into the new Hanoverian army.

Battle honours 

 Peninsular War
 Waterloo
 Battle of Venta del Pozo (1st and 2nd Light Infantry Battalion)
 García Hernández (near Salamanca) (1st Regiment of Dragoons )
 El Bodón (1st Regiment of Hussars)
 Barrosa, near Cádiz, Spain (2nd Regiment of Hussars)
 Göhrde (3rd Regiment of Hussars)

Memorials 
 Plaques on the outside wall of 'La Haye Sainte'
 Monument opposite 'La Haye Sainte' commemorating the dead of the KGL
 Hanover – the Waterloo-column
 Hanover – near the Waterloo Square in front of the archives stands a statue of Carl von Alten
 Hanover – also near the archives is a plaque commemorating Major Georg Baring
 Hanover – the Legion’s-bridge crossing the river Ihme, was originally named Waterloo-Bridge and is now renamed for the King's German Legion
 Osnabrück – The Heger Tor, formerly called the Waterloo Tor, or the Waterloo Gate, commemorating the officers and soldiers of the KGL
 Commemorative stone at Wittingen, Lower Saxony. Inscription: Des Königs Deutsche Legion 1803–1815 – Peninsula, Waterloo, Göhrde
 On the Gehrdener mountain is a stone commemorating Carl Ludewig von Holle, fallen in Waterloo
 On the monument for the Battle of Vittoria is a plaque for the KGL

German army 

After the unification of Germany, some of the old KGL units that had served in the Hanoverian Army were perpetuated in the Imperial German Army, which eventually led to their serving in the Reichswehr and the Wehrmacht. These were:
 Kavallerie-Regiment 13–1st Regiment of Light Dragoons
 Kavallerie-Regiment 13–2nd Regiment of Light Dragoons
 Kavallerie-Regiment 14–1st Regiment of Hussars
 Infanterie-Regiment 16–1st Line Battalion
 Infanterie-Regiment 17–1st Light Battalion

See also 
 British military history
 Russian–German Legion
 Portuguese Legion (Napoleonic Wars)

Sources

References

Bibliography 
 Adkin, Mark. The Waterloo Companion London: Aurum Press, 2001 
 Barbero, Alessandro. The Battle of Waterloo.  Walker and Company, 2005, .
 Beamish, N. Ludlow. History of the King's German Legion vol 1,1832 reprint Naval and Military Press, 1997 
 Beamish, N. Ludlow. History of the King's German Legion vol 2,1832 reprint Naval and Military Press, 1997 
 Chappell, Mike. The King's German Legion (1) 1803–1812.  Botley, Oxford: Osprey Publishing, 2000. .
 Chappell, Mike. The King's German Legion (2) 1812–1815.  Botley, Oxford: Osprey Publishing, 2000. .
 Lindau, Friedrich A Waterloo Hero: The Adventures of Friedrich Lindau. Pen and Sword 2009. .
 Mastnak, Jens. Die King's German Legion 1803–1816: Lebenswirklichkeit in einer militärischen Formation der Koalitionskriege. Celle: Bomann-Museum, 2015. (Forschungen zur Hannoverschen Militärgeschichte, 2; Zugl.: Vechta, Univ., Diss., 2013) 
 McGrigor, Mary: Wellington's Spies Pen and Sword Books Barnsley 2005 
 Pfannkuche, Adolf: Die Königlich Deutsche Legion 1803–1816. 2. Auflage, Helwingsche Verlagsbuchhandlung, Hannover 1926 (de)
 Smith, Digby. The Napoleonic Wars Data Book. London: Greenhill, 1998. 
 Urban, Mark. Wellington's Rifles: Six Years with England's Legendary Sharpshooters. 2004.

External links 
 King’s German Legion (in German) 2nd light battalion and 5th line battalion re-enactment society
 King’s German Legion (in German) 5th line battalion re-enactment group
 King´s German Legion (in German) 5th line battalion (grenadier company) re-enactment group
 King’s German Legion (in German & English)
 King's German Legion(English) Memoirs of Baron von Ompteda (download)
 King's German Legion(English)"Journal of an officer in the King's German Legion"

 
Military units and formations disestablished in 1816
Regiments of the British Army
19th-century military history of the United Kingdom
German military units and formations of the Napoleonic Wars
British military units and formations of the Napoleonic Wars
Military units and formations established in 1803
German regiments in British Service
Foreign regiments in British Service